Alwin Albert Hafner  (MSF) (11 September 1930 – 7 January 2016) was a Roman Catholic bishop.

Ordained to the priesthood in 1957, Hafner served as bishop of the Roman Catholic Diocese of Morombe, Madagascar from 1989 to 2000.

See also

References

1930 births
2016 deaths
20th-century Roman Catholic bishops in Madagascar
Roman Catholic bishops of Morombe